The 1996 Copa CONMEBOL was the fifth edition of CONMEBOL's annual club tournament. Teams that failed to qualify for the Copa Libertadores played in this tournament. Sixteen teams from the ten South American football confederations qualified for this tournament. Lanús defeated Santa Fe in the finals.

Qualified teams

Bracket

First round

|}

Quarterfinals

|}

Semifinals

|}

Finals

|}

External links
CONMEBOL 1996 at RSSSF
CONMEBOL 1996 at CONMEBOL Official Website

Copa CONMEBOL
3